Hella Maria Brock (née Siegmund-Schultze; 3 October 191930 November 2020) was a German music educator, musicologist, and an internationally known Edvard Grieg scholar. Brock was professor of music and English studies at the Leipzig University.

Life 
She attended elementary schools in Magdeburg and Liegnitz, and from 1934 to 1939 the Lyzeum in Liegnitz, where she passed the Abitur in 1939. She was called up for the Reichsarbeitsdienst (compulsory service). From 1940 to 1942 she studied musicology, music pedagogy, piano and English literature at the University of Breslau. She continued her studies in Vienna from 1942 to 1944 at the University of Vienna and the Vienna Academy of Music, where she passed the Staatsexamen for teaching music at secondary schools at the university in March 1944. She then pursued studies of English language and literature at the University of Breslau until the war-related evacuation in 1945.

After flight and expulsion, she moved to Wegeleben in February 1945. At the University of Halle she passed the external Staatsexamen in English language and literature for the teaching profession at secondary schools in March 1945, and in the autumn the exam for Assessor, the higher teaching profession in music and English.

In 1959, she became the founding director of the Institute for Music Education at the Ernst-Moritz-Arndt-University of Greifswald, where she taught the methodology of music teaching, work analysis and music history. In Greifswald, she habilitated (completed postdoctoral research) in 1960 with a thesis, again with Reuter, on Inhalt und Funktion des deutschen Schulliederbuches von der Gründung des Deutschen Reiches bis zum Ende des 2. Weltkrieges (English: Content and function of the German school song book from the foundation of the German Reich to the end of World War II) and was appointed professor for theory and methodology of music education in 1963. In 1972 she was appointed professor of cultural studies and German studies at the Karl-Marx-Universität Leipzig. Brock worked for many years on the commission for the development of study programs for music education in the GDR and was temporarily head of this commission. She retired at the end of the spring semester 1980.

From 1967 to 1971, she was a member of the Volkskammer in the parliamentary group of the Cultural Association of the GDR.

Grieg research 

In 1985 she received permission to travel to Oslo for research purposes. In the following years she completed her knowledge of the Norwegian language and collaborated with Grieg researchers from the Norwegian Academy of Science and Letters. Brock published fundamental works about Grieg in German.

Brock was significantly involved in the preservation of the former place of work of Edvard Grieg in Leipzig. In October 1998 the association  (Grieg Meeting Place) was founded in Leipzig, to establish a memorial and meeting place for the composer in the house built in 1874 by Otto Brückwald for the Edition Peters publishing house. Brock was elected the first president of the association. They were successful in restoring the dilapidated private rooms of the publisher families Max Abraham and Henri Hinrichsen, where Grieg had been a frequent guest, with his guest apartment. The rooms were opened to the public in 2005.

Under Brock's leadership, the association held two Grieg conferences with international participation in 2004 and 2008. She resigned from presidency in 2008, and became its honorary president.

Family 
Brock had a daughter (born 1953) and a son (born 1955). Her brother Walther Siegmund-Schultze was also a musicologist. Brock died in Dippoldiswalde at age 101 of a COVID-19 infection.

Awards 
Brock received awards including:
  (1958, 1964)
  in Bronze (1964)
 Clara Zetkin Medal (1971)
 Ehrenmitglied der Internationalen Edvard-Grieg-Gesellschaft (2009)
 Ehrenpräsidentin des Vereins Grieg-Begegnungsstätte Leipzig (2009)

Publications 
Brock's publications include:
 Musiktheater in der Schule. Eine Dramaturgie der Schuloper. Breitkopf & Härtel, Leipzig 1960.
 Unterrichtshilfen Musik. 7. und 8. Klasse (together with Herbert Zimpel), Verlag Volk und Wissen, Berlin 1970.
 Jugendlexikon Musik (edited together with Christoph Kleinschmidt), Bibliographisches Institut, Leipzig 1983., 
 Musik hören – Musik erleben. Verlag Volk und Wissen, Berlin 1985., 
 Edvard Grieg. Reclam-Verlag, Leipzig 1990, .
 Edvard Grieg im Musikunterricht. Betrachtungen unter interkulturellen und polyästhetischen Aspekten. Hildegard-Junker-Verlag, Altenmedingen 1995, .
 Edvard Grieg. Briefwechsel mit dem Musikverlag C. F. Peters 1863–1907. (together with Finn Benestad), Edition Peters, Frankfurt Main 1997, .
 Edvard Grieg als Musikschriftsteller. Hildegard-Junker-Verlag, Altenmedingen 1999, .
 Griegs Musik zu Ibsens Peer Gynt. Bereicherung und Eigenständigkeit. Hildegard-Junker-Verlag, Altenmedingen 2001, .

References

Further reading 
 Horst Seeger, Andre Asriel (eds.): Musiklexikon. vol. 1. A–K. Deutscher Verlag für Musik, Leipzig 1966, .
 Helmut Loos: Engagement und Energie im Dienste Edvard Griegs. Leipziger Volkszeitung, 4 October 2019, .

External links 
 
 
 
 Prof. Dr. phil. habil. Hella Brock on 

1919 births
2020 deaths
People from Jessen (Elster)
People from the Province of Saxony
Cultural Association of the GDR members
Members of the 5th Volkskammer
German music educators
Women musicologists
German women non-fiction writers
20th-century German musicologists
20th-century German women writers
20th-century German non-fiction writers
Academic staff of the University of Greifswald
Academic staff of Leipzig University
Reich Labour Service members
World War II refugees
German centenarians
Women centenarians
Deaths from the COVID-19 pandemic in Germany